The Sandakan War Monument is a monument established by the British located in the town of Sandakan, Malaysia, to commemorates the town citizens who died during the Second World War. The monument is part of the Sandakan Heritage Trails, a "Heritage Trail" which connects every historic sights of Sandakan.

Description 

The monument exists in two versions. The original, a stele of marble is outside the old courthouse (Sandakan High Court). It bears an inscription in Chinese (front) and English (rear). The English inscription reads:

While the new version is located only a few dozen metres away on the MPS Square. The metal plate on this replica is provided with an identical inscription.

References 

Buildings and structures in Sandakan
Monuments and memorials in Sabah